This article details the North Wales Crusaders Rugby League Football Club's 2012 season. This was the club's first ever season after reforming after the former Super League club Crusaders Rugby League folded.

The club was founded in late 2011 and officially joined Championship 1, the third tier of rugby league in the United Kingdom, on 11 October 2011. Their name, which continues the Crusaders branding, was selected in a fan contest. Clive Griffiths was confirmed as North Wales Crusaders Head Coach on 23 November and started his search for players. 
The club held open trials for any new players to attend, as well as scouring the local amateur game and signing players from Super League academies.

Preseason

2012 Table

2012 Championship 1 fixtures and results

Fixtures and results

2012 Carnegie Challenge Cup fixtures and results

Stats 

For all stats,

Appearances

As of 2/9/12

Points

As of 2/9/12

Tries

As of 2/9/12

Goals

As of 2/9/12

All players
List of players with appearance number. If two players made their debut during the same game shirt numbers will decide which player comes first.

Last updated on 2 September 2012.

2012 Squad

Provisional squad
As part of the 'Operational Guidelines' set out by the Rugby Football League, North Wales Crusaders were instructed to submit a provisional squad of 30 players for Championship 1 2012. Due to the club recruiting players they weren't in a position to do so.
Crusaders decided to let supporters apply to become part of the provisional squad whilst they continued to sign players.

Playing squad

2012 transfers

Gains

Loanees

Losses

End-of-season awards

Awards were presented at the end of season dinner.

Top Scorer of the Year
 Rob Massam (11)

Try of the Year
 Danny Hulme v Toulouse Olympique
Nominations for 'Try of the year' were on the Official website after the final game.

Smash of the Year
Christiaan Roets v South Wales Scorpions
Nominations for 'Smash of the year' were on the Official website after the final game.

Coaches player of the Year
Jonny Walker
Voted for by coaching staff.

Fans player of the Year
Rob Massam
Voted for on the official website

Players player of the Year
Tommy Johnson
Voted for by the playing staff

Most contributed to the club award
Karen and Graham Wiseman

Supporters club Player of the Year
Rob Massam
Voted for by members of the Crusaders Rugby League Supporters Club.

References

North Wales Crusaders
2012 in rugby league by club
2012 in Welsh rugby league